Jean-Louis Carrère (born 4 December 1944) is a French politician who is a member of the Senate, representing the Landes department. He is vice president of the Aquitaine Regional Council and a member of the Socialist Party.

References
Page on the Senate website

1944 births
Living people
People from Orthez
Socialist Party (France) politicians
French Senators of the Fifth Republic
Senators of Landes